Rhantus dani is a species of predaceous diving beetle in the genus Rhantus that was discovered by Balke in 2001.

References
Dytiscidae Species List at Joel Hallan's Biology Catalog. Texas A&M University. Retrieved on 7 May 2012.

dani
Beetles described in 2001